Kramgoa låtar 1999 was released in 1999 as CD and cassette tape. It is a Vikingarna studio album.

Track listing
Våran lilla hemlighet
En slant i fontänen
Still
I mina drömmar
Sjömannen & stjärnan
Vi ska gå hand i hand (Dunja, du)
Nummer ett
Ditt första steg
Kom med mej
Sänd mej ett minne av vår kärlek
Wear My Ring around Your Neck
Ett brev betyder så mycket
Om jag faller faller jag för dig
Sången till dej
Vindar från nordväst (Kuling fra nordvest) (duet Christer Sjögren-Monia Sjöström)

Contributors
Vikingarna
Peter Ljung - keyboard
Janne Lindgren - guitar
Kungliga hovkapellet - strings

Charts

Certifications

References 

1999 albums
Vikingarna (band) albums
Swedish-language albums